Jeedigunta Varun Sandesh (born 21 July 1989) is an Indian American actor known primarily for his works in Telugu cinema. He made his debut with Sekhar Kammula's coming-of-age blockbuster drama Happy Days (2007), and went on to star in films such as  Kotha Bangaru Lokam (2008), Kurradu (2009), Yemaindi Ee Vela (2010), D for Dopidi (2013), Pandavulu Pandavulu Thummeda (2014), Mama Manchu Alludu Kanchu (2015), and  Michael  (2023). In 2019, Sandesh appeared in Telugu reality TV show Bigg Boss 3 as a contestant and finished at fourth place.

Personal life
Varun Sandesh was born in Rayagada, Orissa and later lived in Hyderabad for four years. His family then moved to Bridgewater Township, New Jersey, in the United States, where he was educated.
Varun Sandesh is the grandson of noted Telugu writer Jeedigunta Ramachandra Murthy, who worked for All India Radio for 28 years in Hyderabad. His uncle Jeedigunta Sridhar is a popular Telugu television personality in Hyderabad, India. He has one younger sister, Veena Sahithi, who has worked as a singer and lyricist in Nandini Reddy's Ala Modalaindi.

Sandesh and actress Shraddha Das, who was his co-star in Maro Charitra, had a short-lived relationship in 2011. Varun got engaged with actress Vithika Sheru on 7 December 2015, and they went on to get married.

Career
In 2007, Sandesh applied for auditions for a Sekhar Kammula film through an online advertisement, despite having no prior acting experience and previously planning to pursue medical studies.

He received a reply of one scene's film script, which he was asked to act out and send back. He shot and sent video clippings of himself to Kammula, which promptly landed him a lead role in the film Happy Days. Featuring an ensemble cast, comprised almost entirely with newcomers, Happy Days was a major critical and commercial success, winning several accolades, including six Filmfare Awards South and three Nandi Awards.

He then starred in romantic drama Kotha Bangaru Lokam (2008), which received critical acclaim and went on to become one of the biggest blockbusters of the year. Sandesh followed this initial success by starring in a number of films that did not perform well at the box office, including action film Kurradu (2009), a remake of the 2007 Tamil hit film Polladhavan, and romantic drama Maro Charitra (2010), a remake of the K. Balachander-directed 1978 blockbuster of the same title, which starred Kamal Haasan. Sandesh's career prospects declined further following a series of box office flops through the 2010s, with his only successes being the romantic comedy Yemaindi Ee Vela (2010), crime comedy D for Dopidi (2013), and ensemble comedy Pandavulu Pandavulu Thummeda (2014).

In 2019, Sandesh became a notable television personality for his participation in Star Maa's reality TV show Bigg Boss Telugu 3, reaching the grand finale and finishing in 4th place. Sandesh is also the brand ambassador for the Kalanjali store in Andhra Pradesh, India.

Filmography

Films

Television

References

External links
 
 

1989 births
Living people
Telugu people
Male actors in Telugu cinema
Indian male film actors
21st-century Indian male actors
Indian emigrants to the United States
Male actors from Odisha
American male actors of Indian descent
People from Bridgewater Township, New Jersey